The 1964 Missouri lieutenant gubernatorial election was held on November 3, 1964. Democratic nominee Thomas Eagleton defeated Republican nominee Jewett M. Fulkerson with 64.78% of the vote.

Primary elections
Primary elections were held on August 4, 1964.

Democratic primary

Candidates
Thomas Eagleton, Missouri Attorney General
Willard R. McDonald
Scott Ousley

Results

General election

Candidates
Thomas Eagleton, Democratic
Jewett M. Fulkerson, Republican

Results

References

1964
Gubernatorial
Missouri